Kiss Me Once Live at the SSE Hydro is the seventh live album by Australian singer Kylie Minogue.

Background and release
The show was filmed during her "Kiss Me Once Tour" at the SSE Hydro in Glasgow and directed by William Baker. It was released on most formats including a double-disc CD, DVD, and Blu-ray. "Timebomb", which was not aired on the ITV special, was released to Kylie's official YouTube account as a sneak peek for the Blu-ray/CD and DVD/CD sets on 4 March 2015. "Tears on My Pillow" was performed in Glasgow and is also included on the DVD/Blu-ray, but is not included on the CD. The official cover of this video is a slightly silhouetted image of Kylie performing "Les Sex" on a giant lip couch. The video was released on 23 March 2015. The DVD/Blu-ray also includes "Sleepwalker", a short film which was played before each show started, and screen projections for "In My Arms", "Skirt", "Chasing Ghosts", "Sexercize" and "Can't Get You Out of My Head".

Track listing

Weekly charts

Album

DVD

Year-end charts

DVD

References

2015 live albums
Kylie Minogue live albums